Gustav Wilhelm Hamel (25 June 1889 – missing 23 May 1914) was a pioneer British aviator.  He was prominent in the early history of aviation in Britain, and in particular that of Hendon airfield, where Claude Graham-White was energetically developing and promoting flying.

Early life
Gustav Hamel was the only son of Dr Gustav Hugo Hamel (Royal Physician to King Edward VII) and his wife, Caroline Magdalena Elise. He was actually born in Hamburg, Germany as the oldest child to his parents followed by his sisters Magdalena Augusta Hilda Hamel (21 January 1891) and Dorothea Minna Hamel (February 1893). His youngest sister Anna Elise Bertha Hamel was born in London (6 October 1899). His family moved to England around 1899 to Kingston-upon-Thames and were naturalised as citizens around 1910. He was educated at Westminster School between 1901 and 1907.

Aviation career

1910-11
He learned to fly at the Blériot school at Pau, France in 1910 : after observing his first flight Louis Blériot commented that he had never seen a pilot with such natural ability.  He obtained Aéro-Club de France's certificate no. 358 on 3 February 1911 and the Royal Aero Club's Aviator's certificate no. 64 on 14 February. In March he won first prize in a race from Hendon to Brooklands and back, and on 14 April 1911  he flew from Brooklands to Hendon in a record 17 minutes.<ref>Fast Trip From Brooklands to Hendon Flight]] 22 April 1911, p. 254</ref>  In May he was one of the pilots who took part in a demonstration of flying to various members of the government, where he demonstrated the usefulness of aircraft for carrying dispatches by flying a message to Aldershot and returning with a reply. The  round trip took two hours, much of this time due to difficulty in starting his engine for the return journey.  In July 1911 he was one of the British representatives in the competition for the Gordon Bennett Trophy but crashed shortly after takeoff, fortunately without injury.  Later that month he competed in the Daily Mail Circuit of Britain race, reaching Thornhill, north of Dumfries, before  retiring after a forced landing due to engine problems in which he was slightly injured.

An item in the magazine Flight, of 26 August 1911, covered Hamel's unsuccessful attempt to convey newspapers from Hendon to Southend the previous Saturday.
It appears that the publisher sponsored this event as a publicity stunt. 
However, heavy weather forced his aircraft down at Hammersmith in West London.

On Saturday 9 September 1911 Hamel flew a Blériot XI the 19 miles between Hendon and Windsor in 18 minutes to deliver the first official airmail carried in Great Britain. He carried one bag of mail with 300-400 letters, about 800 postcards and a few newspapers weighing 23Ib and arrived safely at Windsor around 5.13pm. Included was a postcard he had written en route.  The centenary of the event was marked by the Royal Mail with the issue of a set of commemorative postage stamps on 9 September 2011.

On 12 October 1911 Hamel made his first cross-channel flight when he ferried a new Bleriot monoplane from Boulogne to Wembley. This was the first of 21 cross channel flight that he was to make.

1912

Hamel made the first cross-channel flight with a woman as passenger on 2 April 1912, when he flew Eleanor Trehawke Davies from Hendon to Paris, with intermediate stops at Ambleteuse and Hardelot.  Later in the month he assisted Harriet Quimby to become the first woman pilot to cross the channel by testing her newly-delivered Blériot monoplane before her flight.

Hamel made the  first flight from Hedon airfield near Hull on Friday 2 August 1912.
    
Hamel took part in the first Aerial Derby race, carrying Eleanor Trehawke Davies as a passenger. At first he was credited with the fastest time, since Thomas Sopwith was disqualified for missing one of the control points, but after Sopwith successfully appealed Hamel was relegated to second place.

1913
In April 1913 Hamel made the first cross-channel return flight carrying a passenger, the Evening Standard journalist Frank Dupree. and later that month flew with Dupree as passenger from Dover to Cologne, the first time that a flight had been made from England to Germany.  The flight, sponsored by the Evening Standard, was intended to draw attention to Britain's need for military aircraft.

In August 1913 a seventy five mile air race around the Midlands was arranged between Bentfield Hucks and Hamel. The take-off point for the contest was the Tally-Ho grounds, adjacent to Cannon Hill Park. Both aviators  then flew anti-clockwise around the circuit, landing at Redditch recreation ground, Coventry, Nuneaton, Tamworth and Walsall  and  finishing at Edgbaston. Hamel won the race by a margin of just twenty seconds.

Following his disappointment the previous year Hamel entered the 1913 Aerial Derby, flying a Morane-Saulnier monoplane.  This time he won the competition, completing the course in 1h 15m 49s at a speed of  despite a fuel leak which resulted in him having to fly part of the course plugging the leak with his finger.

Hamel was quite active in Worcestershire, visiting Pershore racecourse in October 1913 where he gave exhibitions of flying. He also visited Upton-on-Severn, Worcester Racecourse and Kidderminster cricket ground in October 1913.

1914
Late in 1913, looping the loop was perfected and became a popular event during public flying displays. On 2 January 1914, Hamel took Eleanor Trehawke Davies aloft to experience a loop, and she thus became the first woman in the world to do so.  On 2 February he gave an exhibition of looping to the Royal Family at Windsor, making 14 loops before landing on the East Lawn of Windsor Castle. After lunch with the Royal family he gave a second exhibition before returning to Hendon.
    
In March 1914 Hamel flew to Cardiff to give a public flying display. While there he met Charles Horace Watkins, who was an engineer perfecting his own aircraft called the Robin Gôch, or Red Robin. Contemporary newspaper reports indicate that a few minutes after they met, Hamel flew them both to Watkins' hangar, where they inspected the Robin Gôch.

In May Hamel announced that he intended to attempt to win the [[Daily Mail aviation prizes|£10,000 prize awarded by the Daily Mail for a flight across the Atlantic ocean, flying a specially built Martin-Handasyde monoplane.

Disappearance

Hamel died before reaching the age of 25. He disappeared over the English Channel on 23 May 1914 while returning from Villacoublay on a new 80 hp Gnome Monosoupape engined Morane-Saulnier monoplane he had just collected, and was to compete with in the Aerial Derby the same day.

On 6 July 1914 the crew of a fishing vessel found a body in the Channel off Boulogne. Although they did not retrieve the body, their description of items of clothing and of finding a road map of southern England on the corpse provided strong circumstantial evidence that the body was Hamel's.

At this time of high international tension, there was speculation that he might have been the victim of sabotage, but no trace of the aircraft was ever found and the story faded with his memory.
     
His contribution to flying, however did not end entirely with his death: posthumously published was a seminal co-authored book, Flying; some practical experiences.

See also 
 List of people who disappeared mysteriously at sea

References

Additional links
  Daily Mail Circuit of Britain Air Race Film of Hamel and other contestants at Brooklands, 22 July 1911 
 Britania Military Bleriot Film of Hamel and Frank Dupree of the London Standard before the first flight from England to Germany, Dover to Cologne, 17 April 1913
 New York Times, 21 May 1914 Article on Hamel's Atlantic flight with H. L. Forster
 The Fateful Year. England 1914 by Mark Bostridge (2014)
 (in Romanian)

1889 births
1914 deaths
Aviators killed in aviation accidents or incidents
British aviation pioneers
British aviation record holders
Missing aviators
People educated at Westminster School, London
People lost at sea
Victims of aviation accidents or incidents in 1914
Victims of aviation accidents or incidents in the United Kingdom